Aalapur is a town and tehsil in Ambedkar Nagar district in the Indian state of Uttar Pradesh, India. It is a part of Faizabad division (now Ayodhya division) in Uttar Pradesh state. Aalapur is 33 km east of district headquarters Akbarpur city.

Demographic
As of the 2011 India census, Aalapur had a population of 240. Males constituted 127 of the population and females 117. There were 34 households.

Township
Alapur Subdivision have Only One Township in Rajesultanpur

City/Town Area
Rajesultanpur
 Jahangir Ganj

Market
Ram Nagar
Sabitpur
Sukalbazzar
Padumpur
Siknghalpatti
Devriya Bazaar
Giryia Bazaar
Indaipur
Madarmau

See also
 List of villages in India

References

Villages in Ambedkar Nagar district